LOT Polish Airlines Flight 007 was an Ilyushin Il-62 that crashed near Okęcie Airport in Warsaw, Poland, on 14 March 1980, as the crew aborted a landing and attempted to go-around. All 87 crew and passengers died. It was caused by the disintegration of one of the turbine discs in one of the plane's engines, leading to uncontained engine failure. The turbine disc was later found to have manufacturing faults.

The aircraft and crew 
LOT initiated their transatlantic routes in the early 1970s, for which it decided to purchase Ilyushin Il-62s. The aircraft which crashed was the first Il-62 that LOT had purchased for this purpose, manufactured in 1971. As with all Ilyushins purchased, it was named after a famous Polish historical figure, in this case the astronomer Nicolaus Copernicus.

All of the crew members of flight seven were Polish. The captain, Paweł Lipowczan, was 46 years old, with 8,770 flight hours' experience (4,385 of them on Ilyushin Il-62s). The first officer was Tadeusz Łochocki. The remaining flight crew were flight engineer Jan Łubniewski, flight navigator Konstanty Chorzewski and radio operator Stefan Wąsiewicz. There were five flight attendants on board.

Future World Heavyweight Champion Tony Tucker was supposed to be on this flight but could not go because of a shoulder injury. All 87 people on board were killed, including 22 members of the U.S. boxing team.

Crash 
On its final flight, the aircraft was piloted by Captain Lipowczan and First Officer Łochocki. Flight 007 was scheduled to depart from Kennedy International Airport at about 19:00 local time on 13 March 1980, but it was delayed because of a heavy snowstorm. It finally departed at 21:18, and after nine hours of an uneventful flight, it was approaching Okęcie Airport at 11:13 local time. During their final approach, about one minute before the landing, the crew reported to Okęcie Air Traffic Control that the landing gear indicator light was not operating, and that they would go around and allow the flight engineer to check if it was caused by a burnt-out fuse or light bulb, or if there was actually some problem with the gears deploying.

(11:13:46) Okęcie Air Traffic Control: LOT 007, 5 degrees to the right.

(11:13:52) Okęcie ATC: LOT 007?

(11:13:54) LOT: Roger that... One moment, we have some problems with landing-gear-down-and-locked indicator, request a go-around.

(11:14:00) LOT: Runway heading and 650.

This was the last transmission from Mikołaj Kopernik.
Nine seconds later, the aircraft suddenly entered a steep dive. At the last moment Captain Lipowczan, using nothing but the plane's ailerons, managed to avoid hitting a correctional facility for teenagers located at Rozwojowa Street. On impact, the aircraft disintegrated; a large part of the main hull submerged in the moat, while the tail and parts of the main landing gear landed a few meters further, just before the entrance to the fort. On the scene, a diving team was later trying to recover parts of the aircraft (including some of the engines) from the moat, but it was far too murky; ultimately, the moat had to be drained to allow the air crash investigation team to recover parts of the disintegrated plane.

Among the 87 fatalities were Polish singer Anna Jantar, American ethnomusicologist Alan P. Merriam, six Polish students returning home from an AIESEC conference in New York, and a contingent of the U.S. amateur boxing team (who were scheduled for a series of exhibition fights in Europe instead of the boycotted Summer Olympics.) According to the doctors who arrived at the scene, many of the passengers were apparently asleep when the plane hit the ground, but some of them – including many of the boxers – were supposedly aware that they were about to crash, as they held to their seats so strongly that on impact, the muscles and tendons in their arms became severed. Some reports suggested that some of the boxers actually survived the crash and drowned in the moat, but no evidence for this was presented. A total of 22 U.S. boxers, trainers, and doctors died in the accident (including the 1979 Pan American Games winner light welterweight Lemuel Steeples). A number of Olympic team members were not present due to various pugilistic injuries sustained before the flight or for other reasons, which prevented their participation in the scheduled event, so they stayed in the United States.

Investigation 
The police quickly surrounded the site and removed any spectators; recovery of airplane pieces started soon afterwards. Both the cockpit voice recorder and flight data recorder were found quickly; unfortunately, the recording suddenly stopped nine seconds after the last transmission, 26 seconds before the crash.

While recovering the engines, the number-two (inner left) engine was found to be cut in half, held together only by the fuel lines. When the engine was further examined, the disc of the low-pressure turbine was found to be missing; despite an extensive search, it was not found at the crash site.

After recovering the cockpit, the throttles of both engines 2 and 3 (inner right) were found to be shut off, while on engine 4 (outer right) the thrust was set to maximum. The investigating commission asked the Soviets if an Il-62 was able to reach the runway with one engine operating; no conclusive answer was received, but calculations based on the official technical data suggested that, while one engine thrust was insufficient for the aircraft to maintain altitude, it was enough to reach the runway and try to land. No explanation was found why the aircraft with one engine operating at maximum power suddenly entered a steep dive.

Detailed analysis of the pieces of the turbine disc found several metallic impurities on the edges of two of them; in one case, they were identified as coming from the engine nacelle, in another, the impurities came from the nacelle, the hull, control actuators and finally, electrical cables. Also, detailed examination of the surface of the broken disc showed significant evidence of fatigue cracking.

Sequence of events 
Finally, when the control pushers were found to be cut in half, it was proven that the cut was not caused by the crash, and some traces of the metal alloy the turbine disc was made of were found on the surface of the cut, the sequence of events became clear. The disaster started when Mikołaj Kopernik was instructed to climb to a higher flight level. When the necessary thrust was applied to all four engines, the low-pressure turbine of the number 2 engine disintegrated after 9 seconds. One piece of the turbine disc got ejected upwards, not causing any significant damage; the second piece shot into the engine number 1, damaging it seriously; finally, the third piece of the disc shot into the hull, severed the rudder and elevator control rods and destroyed the number 3 engine, causing loss of control over the plane; it also severed power cables for both the flight data recorder and the cockpit voice recorder. This caused the last moments of Mikołaj Kopernik not to be recorded.

The cut control rods also explained the sudden dive. When they were cut, the horizontal stabilizer, under its own weight, dropped down, causing the nose also to go down. This could be counteracted by the vertical trim; in Il-62s, the switch setting the vertical trim to manual operation was secured by a thin, sharp wire. On Captain Lipowczan's right hand, small wounds were found, and they were confirmed to be made while Lipowczan was still alive; supposedly, he ripped the security off and tried to control the vertical trim, but it was too late.

In an interview for Polish TV series The Black Series, Captain Tomasz Smolicz, an experienced airline pilot who flew thousands of hours on transatlantic routes on Ilyushins Il-62 and Il-62M in the 1970s and 1980s (he flew Mikołaj Kopernik from Warsaw to New York on 13 March 1980), stated that the planes returning to Warsaw from the United States usually landed on runway course 150 (150 degrees, south-south-east), and if they landed at or before noon on a sunny day (such as on 14 March 1980), the sun was shining almost directly in their eyes, which were weary after several hours of night flight and constant monitoring of cockpit instruments; this sometimes caused disorientation and confusion if an indicator light actually was lit or not; so, on that day, the landing gear indicator could have actually been lit, but the crew members might have managed to see it incorrectly. During the recovery, the landing gear was found to be properly extended and locked.

Causes of disaster 

According to the Polish government's Special Disaster Commission, the crash was caused by defects in materials, faults in the manufacturing process of the Kuznetsov NK-8 jet engine's shaft, and weaknesses in the design of its turbine.

During the manufacturing of the low-pressure shaft, at a location where its section diameter increases, a sharp, 90-degree step was made, resulting in a sudden diameter change over a very short linear length - a classic condition for stress concentration, which results in fatigue cracking at that location. Additionally, the metallurgical analysis found that the shaft was incorrectly heat-treated during manufacture and contained contaminant particles such as non-metallic inclusions, which further reduced the shaft's ability to carry the torsional loads as designed. The improper machining and impurities facilitated an accelerated fatigue fracture of this key engine component via unmitigated formation of micro-cracks through the shaft's core, ultimately leading to its failure.

Over time, the defects in ''Mikołaj Koperniks shaft became large enough, and the shaft broke, resulting in the physical separation of the low-pressure turbine from the low-pressure compressor. As a result, the low-pressure turbine explosively disintegrated. Ejected with enormous force, pieces of the turbines damaged two further engines and cut through the hull. This caused the failure of the vertical and horizontal flight controls (rudder and elevator), and a catastrophic failure of numerous systems of the aircraft. The sudden loss of control of the flight control surfaces caused a steep, unrecoverable dive, and resulted in a crash, 26 seconds from the time of the original failure.

A press article, released in Poland in 2010 and based on the review of archival documentation kept in IPN claimed that the People's Republic of Poland authorities contributed to the crash by demanding savings from LOT and excessive exploitation of engines. As a result of the economic policy of Edward Gierek in People's Republic of Poland in the second half of the 1970s it began raising prices, which started to drag the country into an economic crisis. In such circumstances, the Ministry of Transport required LOT to reduce costs. One of the first measures to reduce costs was to minimize refueling planes in foreign airports due to higher jet fuel prices. Aircraft were fueled in Poland to the maximum possible take-off weight. As a result, the crew used the full length of the runway. Conversely, they had a relatively small amount of fuel in reserve on the return flight, which sometimes forced them to land in bad weather. Flights with a maximal take off weight increased engine wear, since the engines were under greater load.

NK-8-4 engines were not particularly reliable. Warranty service life was only 5,000 hours, and about half of LOT engines failed after 2000–3000 hours. Because of this, Polish pilots often called the Il-62 "flying coffins". In spite of the low reliability, the airline decided to increase overhaul life intervals to reduce the frequency of repairs, which were carried out in Soviet factories and quite expensive. LOT sent a letter to the Ilyushin Design Bureau containing the results of a test in which it was found that the engines could operate normally 8600 hours without maintenance. From the design bureau office came the answer that the Poles could fly as much as they want, but the manufacturer was responsible only for 5000 flight hours.

Increased stress on the engines and lengthening of the service interval led to growth failure. There were cases when the IL-62 flew from the United States to Warsaw without passengers, on three engines. Representatives of the technical staff at the John F. Kennedy Airport reported two similar flights in the past two years. The most common causes of failure were bending or breaking of the blades. Consequently, there were not enough serviceable engines. LOT fell into the practice of using three engines within the service interval, and a fourth beyond the interval. The investigation revealed the practice to be widespread. The airline called the fourth engines "leaders".

Initially, Mikołaj Kopernik'''s engine 2 was installed on the aircraft SP-LAC Fryderyk Chopin, but after 1,700 hours of flying in 1975, the engine was removed due to damage of the low-pressure compressor's blade and sent for repair to the Soviet Union. After repair, the engine was placed on SP-LAB Tadeusz Kościuszko. After 5000 hours of flight, vibration was detected above the acceptable level and felt noticeably in the back of the aircraft. Therefore, in 1978 the engine was again removed for repair in Poland and subsequently installed on SP-LAA Mikołaj Kopernik. After repair, the engine accumulated 700 flight hours before the accident.

In spite of the vibrations, the defective engine was fitted to the aircraft, it being argued that the vibration level was "below acceptable standards." Before the flight to New York the aircraft was checked by mechanic Zdzisław Jarmoniak, who found that the No.1 engine had a defect in one of the turbine blades. This deformation was located in the lowest (and widest) part of the blade. The mechanic wanted to report it, but found that the defect was already marked there (noted), and the plane was subsequently allowed to fly. As he later explained to investigators, the mechanic decided that the defect was within tolerance. Engine No.3 had 8200 hours operating time without repair. The aircraft was allowed to fly to New York with three engines and only the No.4 engine was fully serviceable.

The engine shaft's disintegration
The Kuznetsov NK-8 is a two-spool turbofan engine with two low pressure turbines driving the fan and low pressure compressor and one high pressure turbine driving the higher stages of the compressor.

As the No. 2 engine's low-pressure shaft failed, the low-pressure turbine suddenly separated from the low-pressure compressor, freeing itself. Because the engine combustion chamber was still producing power, the suddenly freed turbine spun out of control with such enormous speed that within a fraction of a second, the centrifugal force caused the turbine to disintegrate. The enclosure of the turbine failed to contain the pieces of the turbine, which were ejected tangentially at high speed, causing severe damage to the tail section of the aircraft.

 Aftermath 
The Polish government's Special Disaster Commission sent its findings on the cause of the accident to Moscow. In response, Russian engineers and scientists stated that the reasons given were implausible and that the turbine disintegrated because of engine failure, contrary to what was stated in the Polish report. Many years later it was revealed that after Flight 7's crash, all Il-62s used by Soviet officials and VIPs had their engines discreetly replaced with newer ones. At one occasion, a Polish governmental Il-62M had had specially installed newer engines for a joint Polish-Soviet governmental trip to Beijing; after that, the engines were taken back to the Soviet Union.

The Polish commission report also called for some modernizations in the Il-62 design, most notably doubling the flight controls, so that if one system failed the plane would still be controllable. At the time, redundant controls of this kind were in general use in American and European-made airliners. This issue was never addressed by the Soviets; none of their Ilyushins of any type had installed alternate controls.

A small statue dedicated to the boxers who perished in the accident – a trigonal prism made of bronze, with a knocked-out boxer statue at the top—is located at the grounds of Warsaw sport club Skra Warszawa. An identical statue is located at the United States Olympic Training Center in Colorado Springs. The statues were funded by Thomas Kane of Printon Kane and Company and AIBA and designed by American sculptor Auldwin Thomas Schonberg.

The graves of Mikołaj Koperniks crew are located at the Powązki Military Cemetery in Warsaw. One of the streets adjacent to the crash site bears the name of Captain Paweł Lipowczan.

See also 

 List of accidents and incidents involving commercial aircraft
 Air Algérie Flight 6289
 Dana Air Flight 992
 List of accidents involving sports teams
 LOT Polish Airlines Flight 5055 - caused by failure of an engine's bearings 
 Baikal Airlines Flight 130
 United Airlines Flight 232 - caused by an engine explosion due to a fatigue crack in a fan assembly 
 Eastern Air Lines Flight 401

References 

All information in this entry is based on information, interviews and documents presented in two episodes of the Polish TV series "The Black Series" about air, land and marine incidents and disasters in post-war Poland:  "Kopernik" (about Flight 007) and "Kościuszko" (about LOT Flight 5055).

External links 
 

 PlaneCrashInfo.Com accident report
 Polish press article (polish language)
 Wikipedia map disaster site
 Materials publicized on Polish version of Wikipedia dedicated to same subject

Plane pictures 
Photo of Ilyushin 62 SP-LAA
LOT Polish Airlines Ilyushin IL-62

Disaster site pictures 
 PlaneCrashInfo.Com photo and report
 http://republika.pl/blog_ft_239514/338340/tr/kopernik.jpg
 http://republika.pl/blog_ft_239514/338340/tr/kopernik1.jpg

1980 in Poland
7
Airliner accidents and incidents caused by mechanical failure
Accidents and incidents involving the Ilyushin Il-62
Aviation accidents and incidents in Poland
Aviation accidents and incidents in 1980
History of Warsaw
March 1980 events in Europe
1980s in Warsaw
Airliner accidents and incidents involving uncontained engine failure
1980 disasters in Poland